Gregory Gattuso (born May 18, 1962) is an American football coach and former player.  He is currently the head coach at the University at Albany, taking over from long-time head coach Bob Ford. He was formerly the defensive line coach at the University of Maryland, under head coach Randy Edsall, a position he assumed in January 2011. Gattuso served as the head coach at Duquesne University from 1993 to 2004, compiling a record of 97–32.  From 2005 to 2010, he was an assistant coach at the University of Pittsburgh.

Head coaching record

College

References

External links
 Albany profile

Living people
1962 births
American football defensive linemen
Albany Great Danes football coaches
Duquesne Dukes football coaches
Maryland Terrapins football coaches
Penn State Nittany Lions football coaches
Penn State Nittany Lions football players
Pittsburgh Panthers football coaches
High school football coaches in Pennsylvania
Sportspeople from Pittsburgh
Coaches of American football from Pennsylvania
Players of American football from Pittsburgh